is a Japanese epic martial arts manga series written and illustrated by Takehiko Inoue. It portrays a fictionalized account of the life of Japanese swordsman Musashi Miyamoto, based on Eiji Yoshikawa's novel Musashi. It has been serialized in Kodansha's seinen manga magazine Morning since September 1998, with its chapters collected into thirty-seven tankōbon volumes as of July 2014.

Viz Media licensed the series for English release in North America and has published the current thirty-seven volumes as of April 2015. The series is currently on an extended hiatus, with the latest chapter released in May 2015.

As of December 2012, the manga had over 82 million copies in circulation, making it one of the best-selling manga series of all time. In 2000, Vagabond won the 24th Kodansha Manga Award for the General category, as well as the Grand Prize of the 6th Tezuka Osamu Cultural Prize in 2002.

Summary
The story starts in 1600, in the aftermath of the decisive Battle of Sekigahara. Two 17-year-old teenagers who joined the losing side, Takezō Shinmen and Matahachi Hon'iden, lie wounded in the battlefield and pursued by survivor hunters. They manage to escape and swear to become Invincible Under The Heavens (天下無双, Tenka Musō). They find housing with two women, but are soon attacked by the Tsujikaze gang, and in the confusion of the fight their paths separate: Takezō decides to become a vagabond and wander the world challenging strong opponents, and Matahachi chooses to stay with the women. Takezō returns to his hometown, the Miyamoto village, to tell Matahachi's mother, Osugi Hon'iden, that her son is alive. However, Osugi reacts hostile because the village detests Takezō for his extremely violent and antisocial tendencies, and because the future of the Hon'iden gentry family is compromised now that their heir Matahachi is missing. Osugi pulls strings to accuse Takezō of being a criminal. Takezō fights his pursuers but is eventually caught by the monk Takuan Sōhō, who makes him reconsider his purpose in life. Takuan frees him and, to make him start his life anew, renames him Musashi Miyamoto. Thus begins a story that will show how the legend of the acclaimed sword master Musashi Miyamoto was forged.

Story arcs
Takezō arc: Takezō Shinmen and Matahachi Hon'iden's perilous escape from the battlefield of Sekihagara, their hazardous housing with Okō and Akemi, the events corresponding to Takezō's unwanted return to the Miyamoto village.
First Yoshioka arc: after a 4 years timeskip, Musashi's arrival to Kyōto, his fight against the Yoshioka swords, Matahachi's situation in Kyōto, the fight's aftermath.
Hōzōin arc: Musashi and Jōtarō's arrival to the Hōzōin spears, the events preluding Musashi's fights, Musashi's first fight against the Hōzōin, its aftermath, Musashi's second fight against Hōzōin Inshun, its aftermath, Otsū's situation with the Yagyū, Matahachi's situation with Kojirō Sasaki's certificate.
Yagyū arc: Musashi and Jōtarō's arrival to the Yagyū swords, the events while deliberating how to enter the Yagyū headquarters, Musashi's meeting with the 4 seniors, his solo fight against the Yagyū men, his encounter with Sekishūsai Yagyū and their talk, the fight's aftermath.
Baiken arc: Musashi's training, Matahachi and his family's troubles, the events directly leading to Musashi's fight against Baiken Shishido, their fight, its aftermath, various displays of character backstories.
Kojirō arc: after a reversal to 17 years before the story's start, Kojirō Sasaki's difficult upbringing with Jisai Kanemaki adopting him, various displays of character backstories, timeskip to when Kojirō is 9 and the village's crisis with their protector Yūgetsusai Fudō, its aftermath, timeskip to when Kojirō is 17 and Ittōsai returns dragging Kojirō to a night fight, its aftermath, the travels of Kojirō, Ittōsai and Gonnosuke with a brief encounter with Takezō at the battlefield of Sekihagara, their splitting, the situation of Sadakore's squad, the fights against the peasant groups, Kojirō's fight against Sadakore's squad.
Second Yoshioka arc: return to Musashi's story where it was left, Musashi's return to Kyōto, the events preluding his fight against Seijūrō Yoshioka, their fight, its aftermath with the Yoshioka's various deliberations, Musashi's fight against Denshichirō Yoshioka, its aftermath with the Yoshioka's definitive plan, Musashi's solo battle against 70 Yoshioka men, its outcome.
Post-Yoshioka arc: the aftermath of Musashi's solo battle against 70 Yoshioka men, his stay at the Konpuku temple, his arrest and imprisonment in the Nijō Castle, his escape, Musashi's perilous wandering, his fight against Ittōsai, its aftermath, his housing with a peasant family, his return to wandering, Matahachi's situation with his mother, Kojirō's situation with the Hosokawa clan.
Farming arc: Musashi's meeting with Iori, his stay with him, his plans to turn his barren field into crops, the village's help, Musashi's emergency request, Shūsaku's plans, the aftermath.
Hosokawa arc: Musashi, Iori and Toyozaemon's journey to the retirement estate of Yūsai Hosokawa, Otsū and Jōtarō's situation living with the Yagyū, Kojirō's situation with the Hosokawa.

Production
Takehiko Inoue started Vagabond having wondered what the character was like when he read Musashi. Having come off of drawing a sports manga, he wanted to create a series about more basic concepts, such as "life and death, the human condition, etc.". Rather than portray Musashi's later life in his "enlightened state", which has been written about often, the author chose to depict the lesser known "young man reaching that point of enlightenment when he comes from a place of being so like an animal". In 2009, he stated that he made his weekly deadline thanks to only having to draw the people, with his five assistants drawing the backgrounds.

In April 2009, Inoue told Nishinippon Shimbun that he suspected Vagabond would be ending "within one or two years". Claiming that he did not know how it would end, but that it had entered its final stages. In January 2010, he confirmed it would be ending within the year. However, in September during a hiatus due to health concerns, Inoue announced that the ending had been delayed until 2011. Inoue posted an update on his website in December 2010, stating that Vagabond would not return until he regained "enthusiasm" for the series.

After eighteen-months, Vagabond returned to Morning as a monthly series in March 2012. The manga went on what was supposed to be a four-month hiatus in February 2014, with the reason stated being for Inoue to work on research. However, it was not until January 2015 that the series resumed. The series is currently on an extended hiatus since May 21, 2015, being its 327th chapter, "The Man named Tadaoki", the latest chapter.

Release

Written and illustrated by Takehiko Inoue, Vagabond is based on Eiji Yoshikawa's 1935 novel Musashi. It started serialization in Kodansha's seinen manga magazine Morning on September 17, 1998. Inoue started the series Real in Weekly Young Jump in 1999, and serialized it alongside Vagabond. As of July 2014, the Vagabond chapters have been collected into 37 tankōbon volumes by Kodansha.

Viz Media began releasing Vagabond in English in North America in 2002. Their release retains the color pages from the series' magazine run, and the company has published 37 volumes as of April 21, 2015. Viz's release is distributed in Australasia by Madman Entertainment. In 2008, Viz began re-releasing the series in a format that collects three of the volumes into one. There are currently 12 VIZBIG editions released.

Two art books for the series were released on October 23, 2006; Water containing the manga's colored art and new pieces, and  containing the black and white art as well as early rough sketches. Both were published in North America by Viz on September 16, 2008.

Reception
As of December 2012, Vagabond had over 82 million copies in circulation worldwide.

Vagabond won the Grand Prize for manga at the 4th Japan Media Arts Festival in 2000. The following is an excerpt from the speech congratulating Takehiko Inoue: "From Toyotomi to Tokugawa. Musashi Miyamoto grew up amidst the turn of two great eras. Mr. Inoue has taken the powerful Musashi who was sometimes called a 'beast' and drawn him as a vagabond. The artist brags about boldly challenging the national literary work of Eiji Yoshikawa, even so, the sense of speed that he creates is impressive. I send my applause to the artist for creating a new image of Musashi". The same year, the series won the 24th Kodansha Manga Award in the general category. Vagabond also received the Grand Prize of the 6th Tezuka Osamu Cultural Prize in 2002, and the North American version earned Inoue a nomination for the 2003 Eisner Award in the Best Writer/Artist category.

Notes

References

Further reading

External links
  
 
 

1998 manga
Biographical comics
Comics based on real people
Comics set in the 16th century
Cultural depictions of Miyamoto Musashi
Epic anime and manga
Historical anime and manga
Kodansha manga
Madman Entertainment manga
Martial arts anime and manga
Samurai in anime and manga
Seinen manga
Sharp Point Press titles
Takehiko Inoue
Viz Media manga
Winner of Kodansha Manga Award (General)
Winner of Tezuka Osamu Cultural Prize (Grand Prize)